The Clark Range is a subrange of California's Sierra Nevada in Yosemite National Park.

Geography

The range extends in a north–south direction from Quartzite Peak to Triple Divide Peak and separates the drainage basins of the Illilouette Creek from the uppermost portions of the Merced River. The range is named after Mount Clark, which was named after Galen Clark.

Second-highest is Red Peak, .

Geology
Metamorphic rock composes most of the Clark Range, with the granite of Mount Clark's summit being the main exception.

References

Landforms of Yosemite National Park
Mountain ranges of Madera County, California
Mountain ranges of Northern California